Harborview is a neighborhood in Downtown San Diego, California, United States. It is bordered by Midway to the north, Little Italy to the east, San Diego Bay to the west, and Columbia to the south.

References 
 

Neighborhoods in San Diego
San Diego Bay